Crundale  may refer to:
Crundale, Kent, a village and civil parish in the Ashford District of Kent, England
Crundale, Pembrokeshire, Wales